Vartofta is a locality situated in Falköping Municipality, Västra Götaland County, Sweden. It had 540 inhabitants in 2010.

Vartofta Hundred, or Vartofta härad, was a hundred divided between Småland and Västergötland in Sweden.

References 

Populated places in Västra Götaland County
Populated places in Falköping Municipality